The Amelia Frances Howard-Gibbon Illustrator's Award was presented annually by the Canadian Library Association/Association canadienne des bibliothèques (CLA) to an outstanding illustrator of a new Canadian children's book. The book must be "suitable for children up to and including age 12" and its writing "must be worthy of the book's  illustrations". The illustrator must be a citizen or permanent resident. The prize is a plaque and $1000 presented at the CLA annual conference. The medal commemorates and the award is dedicated to schoolteacher and artist Amelia Frances Howard-Gibbon who taught academics as well as art to Ontario schoolchildren in the 1860s and early 1870s. Her best-known work An Illustrated Comic Alphabet was published in 1966 by Henry Z. Walck in New York City and Oxford University Press in Toronto.

Winners 

The award has been presented to one illustrator for one book every year from 1971.

The writer is listed here ("by" or "retold by") if distinct from the illustrator and the text was original. Otherwise the text was written by the illustrator or was not original ("anthology").

 1971 - Elizabeth Mrazik-Cleaver, The Wind Has Wings: poems from Canada, anthology  
 1972 - Shizuye Takashima, A Child in Prison Camp, biography,   
 1973 - Jacques de Roussan, Au-Delà du Soleil / Beyond the Sun (bi-lingual)   
 1974 - William Kurelek, A Prairie Boy's Winter  
 1975 - Carlo Italiano, The Sleighs of My Childhood  
 1976 - William Kurelek, A Prairie Boy's Summer  
 1977 - Pam Hall, Down by Jim Long's Stage: rhymes for children and young fish, by Al Pittman 
 1978 - Elizabeth Mrazik-Cleaver, The Loon's Necklace, retold by William Toye 
 1979 - Ann Blades, A Salmon for Simon, by Betty Waterton 
 1980 - László Gál, The Twelve Dancing Princesses, retold by Janet Lunn 
 1981 - Douglas Tait, The Trouble with Princesses, by Christie Harris  
 1982 - Heather Woodall, Ytek and the Arctic Orchid: an Inuit legend, by Garnet Hewitt 
 1983 - Lindee Climo, Chester's Barn  
 1984 - Ken Nutt, Zoom at Sea, by Tim Wynne-Jones 
 1985 - Ian Wallace, Chin Chiang and the Dragon's Dance  
 1986 - Ken Nutt, Zoom Away, by Tim Wynne-Jones 
 1987 - Marie-Louise Gay, Moonbeam on a Cat's Ear  
 1988 - Marie-Louise Gay, Rainy Day Magic  
 1989 - Kim LaFave, Amos's Sweater, by Janet Lunn 
 1990 - Kady MacDonald Denton, 'Til All the Stars Have Fallen: Canadian poems for children, anthology  
 1991 - Paul Morin, The Orphan Boy, by Tololwa M. Mollel 
 1992 - Ron Lightburn, Waiting for the Whales, by Sheryl McFarlane 
 1993 - Paul Morin, The Dragon's Pearl, by Julie Lawson 
 1994 - Leo Yerxa, Last Leaf, First Snowflake to Fall, poetry  
 1995 - Barbara Reid, Gifts, by Jo Ellen Bogart 
 1996 - Karen Reczuch, Just Like New, by Ainslie Manson 
 1997 - Harvey Chan, Ghost Train, by Paul Yee 
 1998 - Barbara Reid, The Party  
 1999 - Kady MacDonald Denton, A Child's Treasury of Nursery Rhymes, anthology  
 2000 - Zhong-Yang Huang, The Dragon New Year: A Chinese Legend, by Dave Bouchard 
 2001 - Laura Fernandez and Rick Jacobson, The Magnificent Piano Recital, by Marilynn Reynolds 
 2002 - Frances Wolfe, Where I Live  
 2003 - Pascal Milelli, The Art Room, by Susan Vande Griek 
 2004 - Bill Slavin, Stanley's Party, by Linda Bailey 
 2005 - Wallace Edwards, Monkey Business  
 2006 - Leslie Elizabeth Watts, The Baabaasheep Quartet  
 2007 - Mélanie Watt, Scaredy Squirrel  
 2008 - Mélanie Watt, Chester  
 2009 - Dušan Petričić, Mattland, by Hazel Hutchins and Gail Hebert 
 2010 - Barbara Reid, Perfect Snow  
 2011 - Marie-Louise Gay, Roslyn Rutabaga and the Biggest Hole on Earth!  
 2012 - Matthew Forsythe, My Name is Elizabeth, by Annika Dunklee 
 2013 - Soyeon Kim, You are Stardust, by Elin Kelsey 
 2014 - Jon Klassen, The Dark, by Lemony Snicket 
 2015 - Marie-Louise Gay, Any Questions?  
 2016 - Sydney Smith, Sidewalk Flowers by JonArno Lawson

Repeat winners 

Marie-Louise Gay has won the Illustrator's Award four times from 1987, most recently in 2015. Several others have won it twice.

Winners of multiple awards 

Nine books won both this CLA Illustrator's Award and the Governor General's Award for English-language children's illustration (or Canada Council Children's Literature Prize before 1987). The illustrators and CLA award dates were Blades 1979, Gál 1980, Woodall 1982, (now under the "Governor General's Awards" name) Gay 1988, LaFave 1989, Morin 1991, Lightburn 1992, Reid 1998, and Denton 1999.

See also

 CLA Book of the Year for Children Award
 ALA Caldecott Medal
 British Greenaway Medal

References

External links
 Book Awards at the Canadian Library Association (cla.org)

Canadian art awards
Canadian children's literary awards
Illustrated book awards
Awards established in 1971
1971 establishments in Canada